Kohistani (meaning 'something from the mountainous land' in Persian) may refer to:

something of, from, or related to one of the places known as Kohistan
A surname for someone from 'Kohistan'
Kohistani people, an Indo-Aryan ethnic group of Kohistan, northern Pakistan
Indus Kohistani, an Indo-Aryan language of northern Pakistan
Kohistani Shina language, a Shina variety spoken in northern Pakistan
Kohistani languages, a group of Indo-Aryan languages that includes Indus Kohistani, but does not include Kohistani Shina
Indus Kohistani people
Mir Asadullah Kohistani, former Afghan Army general and commander of Bagram Airfield in 2021 during the Taliban offensive

People with the surname 

 Abdul Sabur Farid Kohistani (1952–2007), Prime Minister of Afghanistan during 1992
 Afzal Kohistani, Pakistani involved in the 2012 Kohistan video case
 Freshta Kohistani (1991–2020), Afghan women's rights activist
 Hammasa Kohistani (born 1987), British-Afghan model
 Israfeel Kohistani (born 1987), Afghan footballer
 Tahmina Kohistani (born 1989), Afghan sprinter